Timothy Francis Smith (born March 20, 1957) is a former National Football League wide receiver who played for the Houston Oilers (1980–1986).

College career

Tim played three years at Nebraska, where he had 72 catches for 1,089 yards. He also punted for the Cornhuskers, averaging 40.1 yards on 135 kicks. As a collegian, he played in the Liberty, Orange and Cotton bowls. He was team captain as a senior and was first-team All-Big Eight.

Professional career

Smith was drafted in the 3rd round of the draft by the Houston Oilers.
He gained more than 1,000 yards receiving in both the 1983 and 1984 seasons.

On April 24, 1987 San Diego Chargers acquired Tim Smith for a 1988 draft choice.

References

1957 births
Living people
American football wide receivers
Nebraska Cornhuskers football players
Houston Oilers players
Players of American football from Tucson, Arizona